Atem may refer to:

 Association for Tertiary Education Management (ATEM)
 Atem (album), a 1973 album by Tangerine Dream
 Atem Kuol Atem, South Sudanese basketball player
 Valentine Atem, a Cameroonian football player

See also
 Yami Yugi, also known as Pharaoh Atem, the main character in the manga and anime series Yu-Gi-Oh!
 Atum, an important deity in Egyptian mythology